Nanwulibao is a metro station of Zhengzhou Metro. This station is an interchange station between Line 2 and Line 5 after Line 5 started operation on 20 May 2019.

Station layout

Exits

References 

Stations of Zhengzhou Metro
Line 2, Zhengzhou Metro
Line 5, Zhengzhou Metro
Railway stations in China opened in 2016